Guy Mardel (born Mardochée Elkoubi; 30 June 1944, in Oran, French Algeria) is a French singer, best known for his participation in the 1965 Eurovision Song Contest.

Mardel lived his first 15 years in Algeria before moving to France in 1959. He later enrolled in law school, while singing recreationally with a jazz band. He signed a contract with AZ Records in 1963 and released two singles before being chosen internally by channel ORTF in 1965 to represent France in that year's Eurovision Song Contest with the song "N'avoue jamais" ("Never admit"). At the contest, held in Naples on 20 March, "N'avoue jamais" finished in third place of the 18 entries.

Mardel was unable to capitalise on his Eurovision success, despite releasing many singles until the 1980s. In the 1970s he moved into record production, setting up his own record label, MM, in 1977. Mardel now lives in Jerusalem.

References

External links 
 Discography and cover art at encyclopédisque.fr

20th-century French male singers
Algerian emigrants to France
French people of Algerian-Jewish descent
French emigrants to Israel
Eurovision Song Contest entrants for France
Eurovision Song Contest entrants of 1965
Musicians from Oran
Pieds-Noirs
1944 births
Living people